Xanthotryxus mongol is a species of cluster fly in the family Polleniidae.

Distribution
Japan, South Korea, China.

References

Polleniidae
Insects described in 1930
Diptera of Asia